Tembiaporá is a district in the department of Caaguazú, Paraguay.

References 

Populated places in the Caaguazú Department